I Do Not Want to Know Who You Are is a 1932 German comedy film directed by Géza von Bolváry and starring Liane Haid, Gustav Fröhlich, and S.Z. Sakall.

The film's sets were designed by the art director Franz Schroedter.

Cast

References

Bibliography

External links 
 

1932 films
1932 comedy films
German comedy films
Films of the Weimar Republic
1930s German-language films
Films directed by Géza von Bolváry
Tobis Film films
German black-and-white films
Films scored by Robert Stolz
1930s German films